Janez Mlinar (14 August 1941 – 2 April 2020) was a Slovenian cross-country skier. He competed in the men's 15 kilometre event at the 1968 Winter Olympics.

References

External links
 

1941 births
2020 deaths
Slovenian male cross-country skiers
Olympic cross-country skiers of Yugoslavia
Cross-country skiers at the 1968 Winter Olympics
People from Kranjska Gora